The 1900 Pittsburgh College football team was an American football team that represented Pittsburgh Catholic College of the Holy Ghost—now known as Duquesne University—during the 1900 college football season. The team finished the season with a record of 3–3–1.

Schedule

References

Pittsburgh College
Duquesne Dukes football seasons
Pittsburgh College football